Ancylis mitterbacheriana is a species of moth of the family Tortricidae. It is found in most of Europe, except the Iberian Peninsula, most of the Balkan Peninsula and Ukraine.

The wingspan is about 13–17 mm. The forewings are ferruginous. The costa is strigulated with black and posteriorly with white. There is a subquadrate dark ferruginous-brown dorsal blotch reaching from the base to the middle, posteriorly whitish-edged and a thick very oblique deep ferruginous streak from middle of costa, sometimes reaching termen beneath apex. The hindwings are rather dark grey. The larva is dull green; head and plate of 2 yellow -brownish, blackish-marked Julius von Kennel provides a full description.

Adults are on wing from May to June.

The larvae feed on Quercus, Malus and Fagus species.

References

External links
Lepiforum.de

Moths described in 1775
Enarmoniini
Moths of Europe
Taxa named by Michael Denis
Taxa named by Ignaz Schiffermüller